The elections in India in 2015 include the two state legislative assembly elections. The tenure of the state legislative assembly of Bihar  are due to expire during the year and the Delhi Legislative Assembly Re-Election will also be held due to the inability to form the government.

Legislative Assembly election

Delhi

The assembly state elections in Delhi were held in a single phase on 7 February, followed by counting on 10 February.

Background
In the 2013 Delhi state elections, the Bharatiya Janata Party (along with its pre-poll ally Shiromani Akali Dal) emerged as the single-largest party, winning 32 out of the 70 seats. However they fell short of an outright majority and therefore were unable to form the government. This led the then Lieutenant Governor of Delhi Najeeb Jung to invite the Aam Aadmi Party, the second largest party after the BJP, to form the government. On 28 December 2013, AAP formed the state government after taking outside support from the Indian National Congress. AAP's leader Arvind Kejriwal, who defeated the incumbent chief minister Sheila Dikshit, became the 7th chief minister of Delhi. However, on 14 February 2014 (after 49 days of rule), Arvind Kejriwal resigned from his post citing the reason as his government's inability to table the Jan Lokpal Bill in Delhi Assembly for discussion due to stiff opposition from other political parties in the house.

Delhi remained thereafter under President's Rule for about a year. On 4 November 2014, the Lieutenant Governor of Delhi Najeeb Jung recommended the Union Cabinet the dissolution of Delhi assembly and conduct fresh elections. On 12 January 2015, the Election Commission of India announced that state assembly elections would be held on 7 February 2015 with results being announced on 10 February 2015.

Bihar

The tenure of the Legislative Assembly of Bihar expired on 29 November 2015.

Parliamentary By-election

Assembly By-elections

Andhra Pradesh

Arunachal Pradesh

Goa

Jharkhand

Kerala

Madhya Pradesh

Maharashtra

Manipur

Meghalaya

Mizoram

Tamil Nadu

Tripura

Uttar Pradesh

West Bengal

References

External links

Election Commission of India

 
Elections in India by year